Şeref Meselesi, is a prime time Turkish television drama series produced by D Productions and broadcast from November 23, 2014 on Kanal D.

It is an adaption of Italian 18 episode series published between 2006 and 2012, L'onore e il rispetto. Last episode was aired on May 17, 2015 at Kanal D channel.

Plot 
This series is about Kılıç family who moves to Istanbul from Ayvalık. Yiğit's father commits suicide because of the Mafia. Yiğit goes to take revenge from Mafia.

Cast

References

2014 Turkish television series debuts
Turkish drama television series
Television series by D Productions
Kanal D original programming
Television series produced in Istanbul
Television shows set in Istanbul
Television series set in the 2010s